Six ships of the Royal Navy have borne the name HMS Racer:

 was a 12-gun  cutter launched in April 1810. She stranded on the French coast in October, which enabled the French to capture her.
 was a 12-gun schooner, formerly the American Independence.  captured her in 1812. Racer was wrecked in the Florida Straits in 1814.
 was a 6-gun cutter launched in 1818, and ordered to be sold in 1830.
 was a 16-gun brig-sloop launched in 1833 and sold in 1852.
 was a  composite screw gunvessel launched in 1884. She was re-classified as a sloop in 1884, used as a salvage vessel from 1917 and was sold in 1928.

See also
 , built as American schooner Racer

Royal Navy ship names